The Pakistan Stock Exchange (abbreviated as PSX) is a stock exchange in Pakistan with trading floors in Karachi, Islamabad and Lahore. PSX was classified by MSCI as a frontier market on 8 September  2021.

The PSX was established on 11 January 2016 after the merger of the Karachi Stock Exchange, Lahore Stock Exchange and Islamabad Stock Exchange. As of January 2022, there are about 375 companies listed on the PSX with a total market capitalisation of PKR 7,756 billion (US$52 billion).

Investors on the exchanges include 1,886 foreign institutional investors and 883 domestic institutional investors along with about 220,000 retail investors. There are also about 400 brokerage houses which are members of the PSX as well as 21 asset management companies. One of the PSX's constituent stock exchanges, the Karachi Stock Exchange, was listed among the world's best performing frontier stock markets: between 2009 and 2015 it delivered an average 26% return annually. In December 2016, PSX sold 40% strategic shares to a Chinese consortium for US$85 million.

History

The Pakistan Stock Exchange (PSX) came into existence in January 2016 when the Government of Pakistan decided to merge the three large exchange markets of the country (based in Karachi, Lahore, and Islamabad) into one combined market.

Karachi Stock Exchange 

Founded on 18 September 1947, Karachi Stock Exchange Limited (KSE) was registered in Pakistan. It was located at the Stock Exchange Building (SEB) on Stock Exchange Road, in the heart of Karachi's business district near I. I. Chundrigar Road. It was Pakistan's largest stock exchange, and was listed among the ten best stock markets in the world in 2015. According to Bloomberg, the Pakistani benchmark stock market index is the third-best performer in the world since 2009. In June 2015, Khaleej Times reported that since 2009, the Pakistani equities delivered 26 percent a year for US dollar investors, making Karachi the best-performing stock exchange in the world. As of 10 July 2015, total market capitalization reached Rs. 7.33 trillion (US$72 billion approximately).

Lahore Stock Exchange 

Lahore Stock Exchange (LSE) was located in Lahore, Pakistan. The Lahore Stock Exchange (Guarantee) Limited came into existence in October 1970, under the Securities and Exchange Ordinance of 1969 by the Government of Pakistan in response to the needs of the provincial metropolis of the province of Punjab. It initially had 83 members and was housed in a rented building in the crowded Bank Square area of Lahore.

Islamabad Stock Exchange 

Islamabad Stock Exchange (ISE) was the youngest of the three stock exchanges of Pakistan, and was located in the capital city, Islamabad. ISE was incorporated as a guarantee-limited company on 25 October 1989. It was located in the ISE Towers, a 22-storey building which is one of the tallest buildings of the city.

Merger 
The PSX was launched on 11 January 2016. Prior to the formal launch, the Karachi Stock Exchange held a two-day pre-production mock trading session for all certificate holders of the three exchanges. The integration is expected to help reduce market fragmentation and create a strong case for attracting strategic partnerships necessary for providing technological expertise and assistance. The integration of the three exchanges has completed the second phase of the Stock Exchanges Demutualization and Integration Act 2012, passed by a joint session of the Parliament.

Trading volumes 
Historic high trading volumes staggering at 2.20 billion shares were recorded on 27 May 2021. It broke the previous record all-time high volume of 1.56 billion shares, recorded on 26 May 2021.

References

External links
 Official website
 Data portal
 Brokerwebsite
   Data portal

 
Economy of Pakistan
Stock exchanges in Pakistan
Companies listed on the Pakistan Stock Exchange
2016 establishments in Pakistan
Financial services companies established in 2016
2016 mergers and acquisitions
Formerly government-owned companies of Pakistan
Pakistani subsidiaries of foreign companies